The 1902 Dublin County Council election was held on 26 May 1902. Only four electoral divisions saw contests. The divisions of Lucan, Pembroke West, Rathfarnham, and Rathmines East had initially been expected to also see contests, however due to candidates withdrawing these divisions went without contests.

Aggregate results

Ward results

Castleknock

Donnybrook

Dundrum

Lusk

Kingstown

Swords

References

1902 Irish local elections
1902